Hospital ships of many types have been part of the United States Navy at least since 1798. Their special status has been internationally recognised under the second Geneva Convention of 1906 and the Hague Convention of 1907.

In this list, the particular roles of some hospital ships are identified, e.g. as ambulance vessels, rescue ships, and evacuation ships. Also included are ships that had a dual role, also serving as barracks ships, receiving ships, supply ships or guard ships.

Pre-Geneva Conventions

Confederate States Hospital Ship

 Star of the West renamed CSS Saint Philip

Post-Geneva Conventions
  (1920–1946)
  (1898–1905, 1908–1909, 1909–1921)
  (1907–1917)
  (1917)
  (1941–1946)
  (1944–1946)
  (1944–1946)
  (1944–1946)
  (1944–1946)
  (1944–1946)
  (1944–1946)
  (1945–1947), (1950–1957)
  (1945–1947)
  (1945–1946)
  (1945–1946, 1950–1955)
  (1945–1950, 1950–1954, 1965–1970)
  (1945–1946, 1966–1971, 1972–1975)
  (1945–1946)
 USNS Mercy (T-AH-19) (1986-)
 USNS Comfort (T-AH-20) (1987-)

Receiving Ships, Supply Ships, and Guard Ships
A receiving ship is any vessel that serves as a point of induction into the service for new recruits. Vessels were not built for the purpose of serving in this role, rather, vessels were appointed. This normally came at the end of a vessels combat career. As such, the vessels condition was such that it was best to remain in port, at anchor. Modifications to ships serving in this role often included the removal of weapons, and the erecting of housing structures on the main deck. Upon release from receiving duties most ships were either decommissioned or transferred to a state's Naval Militia.

Records for the receiving ship were particularly modest and as such very little history is recorded of these once proud ships upon impressment into receiving duties. The actual medical duties of these ships usually was defined by the space available, and based on the need, availability of local Naval Hospitals, and the availability of a medical staff. Each receiving ship played a different role as a hospital ship if any. Refits were done locally and at discretion, if at all. In addition to the receiving ships, store ships and guard ships often took on hospital ship, hospital tender, health ship, or quarantine duties as the need or opportunity arose.

 
 
 
 
 
  
 
 
 
 
 
 
 
 
 
 
 
 
 
 USS Relief I
 USS Valparaiso

Ambulance Boats and Transports
A relatively large number of hospital or ambulance boats have been used by various commands, squadrons, bases, districts, and theaters through most times of conflict and peace. These boats came in all shapes and sizes, and were picked for a variety of reasons, such as availability and need.

 USS Adrian (ex-Westport)
 USS Seagate
 USS Southport
 Ambulance Boat No. One
 Ambulance Boat No. Two
 Landing Craft Utility (Type 1610, 1627, 1646)
 Landing Craft Mechanized (Type 6 and 8)

Landing Ship Tank (Casualty Evacuation)
A number of Commanders modified, outfitted, or simply designated Tank Landing Ships to serve in a dual role as an interim hospital designated LSTH.

Rescue Ships

The PCE-842-class patrol craft class is an armed rescue ship built on the hull of the PCE (Patrol Craft Escort) by the Pullman Standard Car Manufacturing Co. in Chicago, Illinois. Of the 54 PCERs ordered, 13 were laid down, 12 were commissioned, and 5 saw service as rescue ships (PCER - Patrol Craft Escort Rescue). The ships served three missions: damage control / firefighting; casualty treatment / evacuation; and patrol / guardship. Each ship's hospital was composed of 65 beds, a surgical suite, and X-Ray facilities. The medical department consisted of a staff of 11 doctors and hospital corpsmen. Ships designated PCER were numbers 847 to 859. However, PCER-847 was redesignated before commissioning as a PCE. PCERs 848, 849 and 850 underwent conversion in Brisbane, Australia. The refits converted their expansive hospital space into a communications center and the ships new mission was to serve as a signal ship for the US Army landings in the Philippines and Japan. PCERs 856, 857, and 859 missed WWII and saw virtually no service as they were intended. The remaining ships of interest, PCERs 851-855 have had a short but remarkable war record. Some notable ships of this class were:

Rescue Transport Ships
All five of these ships were ordered and cancelled before construction began 12 March 1943. This class was the replacement of the theoretical class referred to as APH (Auxiliary Personnel Transport Hospital). The five ships were named:

Evacuation Ships of WWII
Evacuation ships carried light armament, but did not meet the criteria established by the Geneva Conventions for the designation of Hospital Ship because they carried troops and sometimes arms in combination with injured. An example would be ferrying injured troops away from combat zones and troops and military supplies to combat zones. Most notably, the evacuation ships took part in returning troops at the end of the World War II.

Modified Barracks Ships of Vietnam
Originally planned as Riverine Hospital Ships, the idea was scratched due to the need to bring the ships too close to shore, and required a dual support role. Of the Barracks Ships assigned to the U.S. Mobile Riverine Force, only the Colleton was specially refitted for the expanded hospital role and unofficially assigned the designation APBH (Auxiliary Propulsion Barracks Hospital).

Spearhead-class Expeditionary Fast Transport, Flight II, Ambulance Variant
The  has a "Limited Medical Mission" role for the Flight II Variant of the ship. While not the ship's primary mission, the variant will include a combined forward resuscitative care capability with a limited Intensive Care Unit (ICU) and medical ward. The Flight II Variants are expected to be 338 feet long with a displacement of 2,400 metric tons.

  - Keel Laid 26 Jan 2022, pending delivery
  - Awarded 26 Feb 2021, pending delivery)
  Unnamed (T-EPF-16) - Awarded 4 May 2022, pending delivery, name yet to be announced.

Expeditionary Fast Transport, Medical Variant
Starting with EPF-17, a new class of Joint High-Speed Vessel based on a catamaran hull will be the last of a series of ships the Navy expects to procure from the Austal USA shipyard in Mobile, Alabama. It is expected to be between 1/3 to 1/2 the size of the s. The Fast Expeditionary Medical Variant design calls for a vessel to be 417 feet long and displace 3,100 metric tons, with a draft of just 13 feet. The contract award is expected to be announced in September 2022, and delivery in 2025.

See also
List of U.S. Army hospital ships.

References

 

 
 
+